81 athletes (58 men and 23 women) from Japan competed at the 1996 Summer Paralympics in Atlanta, United States.

Medallists

See also
Japan at the Paralympics
Japan at the 1996 Summer Olympics

References 

Nations at the 1996 Summer Paralympics
1996
Summer Paralympics